Appalachiosaurus ("Appalachian lizard") is a genus of Megalosauroid theropod dinosaur that lived during the mid Campanian age of Early Cretaceous Appalachia, which is now Eastern North America. Like almost all theropods, it was a bipedal predator. It is the most completely known theropod from Eastern North America.

Fossils of Appalachiosaurus were found in central Alabama, from the Demopolis Chalk Formation. This formation dates to the middle of the Campanian age, around 77 million years ago. Fossil material assigned to A. montgomeriensis is also known from the Donoho Creek and Tar Heel-Coachman formations of North and South Carolina.

Discovery and naming
The type specimen was found by Auburn University geologist David King in Alabama in July 1982. This dinosaur was named after the region of the eastern United States known as Appalachia, which also gave its name to the ancient island continent on which Appalachiosaurus lived. Both are named after the Appalachian Mountains. The generic name also includes the Greek word sauros ("lizard"), the most common suffix used in dinosaur names. There is one known species, Appalachiosaurus montgomeriensis, which is named after Montgomery County in the U.S. state of Alabama. Both the genus and species were named in 2005 by paleontologists Thomas Carr and Thomas Williamson.

Description
 
So far, it is only known from partial remains, including parts of the skull and mandible (lower jaw), several vertebrae, parts of the pelvis, and most of both legs. These remains are housed at the McWane Science Center in Birmingham, Alabama. There are several open sutures between bones of the skull, indicating that the animal was not yet an adult. Several elements have been crushed, but the specimen is still informative and shows many unique characteristics. Several of these have been identified in the skull and the claws of the feet, which show an unusual protrusion on the end closest to the body. A row of six low crests lines the top of the snout, similar to Alioramus, although most tyrannosaur species exhibit ornamentation to varying degrees on top of the snout anyways. The only remains found are from a juvenile, meaning that the size and weight of the adult are not known. Appalachiosaurus is significantly different and more derived than other the early tyrannosaurs from Eastern North America, Dryptosaurus and Bistahieversor. 

The arms of Appalachiosaurus are poorly known. Large tyrannosaurids are characterized by proportionally small forelimbs and hands with two functional fingers on each. Except for some reports of a humerus ascribed to Appalachiosaurus, no arm material is known. Early reconstructions gave it long arms with three fingers, but they are now thought to have been much shorter and have only two fingers. Museum mounts have been corrected accordingly, though other locations may support the former theory.  Appalachiosaurus had a bone crushing bite force (sinilar to most large tyrannosaurs) of around 32,500 newtons, or 7,193 pounds per square inch.

Classification

The only known specimen Appalachiosaurus was complete enough to be included in phylogenetic analyses using cladistics. The first was performed before the animal had even been named and found Appalachiosaurus to be a member of the Albertosaurine subfamily of Tyrannosauridae, which also includes Albertosaurus and Gorgosaurus. The original description also included a cladistic analysis, finding Appalachiosaurus montgomeriensis to be a basal tyrannosauroid within Eutyrannosauria, outside of Tyrannosauridae. However, Asian tyrannosaurs like Alioramus and Alectrosaurus were excluded, as was Eotyrannus from England. Earlier tyrannosaurs such as Dilong and Guanlong had not been described at the time this analysis was performed. These exclusions may have a significant effect on the phylogeny.

Below is a cladogram published in 2013 by Loewen et al..

Possible pathology
Two vertebrae of the tail were found to be fused together, possibly a result of new bone growth following some sort of injury.

See also

 Timeline of tyrannosaur research

References

Late Cretaceous dinosaurs of North America
Fossil taxa described in 2005
Tyrannosaurs
Demopolis Chalk
Campanian genus first appearances
Campanian genus extinctions